The 2014 Beach Soccer Intercontinental Cup was the fourth edition of the tournament, Beach Soccer Intercontinental Cup. It took place at Jumeirah Beach in Dubai, United Arab Emirates from 04 to 8 November 2014. Eight teams participated in the competition.

Participating teams

Group stage
All matches are listed as local time in Dubai, (UTC+4).

Group A

Group B

Classification stage

5–8 places

Seventh place match

Fifth place match

Championship stage

Semi-finals

Third place

Final

Awards

Top scorers

Final standings

References

External links
Beach Soccer Worldwide
  Schedule & Results (PDF)

Beach Soccer Intercontinental Cup
2013–14 in Emirati football
International association football competitions hosted by the United Arab Emirates
Intercontinental Cup
Intercontinental Cup